José Lidón, or Josef Lidón, or José Lidón Blázquez, born in Béjar, Salamanca on June 2, 1748, died in Madrid on February 11, 1827, was a Spanish composer, organist and conductor.

Career
Lidón entered the Royal Chapel of Madrid as an altar boy in 1758, having José de Nebra and organist Antonio de Literes as teachers. In 1763 he won a position in the Malaga Cathedral, a position he did not get to fill.

From 1768 he was an organist at the Orense Cathedral and the Madrid Royal Chapel, working in the service first of King Charles IV and afterwards Ferdinand VII. After the return of Ferdinand VII to the throne, he interceded for his friend and fellow composer .

From 1805 until his death he held the charge of director of the Royal Chapel (maestro de la Capilla Real) in Madrid, and rector of the Real Colegio de Niños Cantores.

Work
His work is scattered across multiple archives including the Ciudad Real Cathedral, the National Library of Madrid and the Orihuela Cathedral, Valencia. He composed more than seventy pieces of sacred music (oratories, psalms, Holy Week lamentations) and sonatas and fugues for organ, plus a string quartet.

His well-known Organ Sonata de Primo Tono has been acclaimed as an example of the Age of Romanticism. In Béjar, there is a square in honor of this illustrious citizen.

Selected works
 Ave Maris stella - (4 and 8 voices)
 Cantábile para órgano al alzar en la misa
 El barón de Illescas
 Glaura y Coriolano (premiered at the Prince of Madrid Colosseum in 1792)
 Ofertorio
 Organ Sonata de Primo Tono (Para Trompeta Real)Modern editions
 José Lidón (1748-1827): La música para teclado'', vol. I & II, edited by Dámaso García Fraile, Sociedad Española de Musicología (SEDEM), 2002.

References

External links
AllMusic short biography
José Lidón and his Contemporaries Part I, in spanish
José Lidón and his Contemporaries, Part II, in spanish
Biblioteca Digital Hispánica Scores available.

 

Spanish composers
Spanish male composers
Spanish organists
Male organists
1748 births
1827 deaths